Korla Awgust Kocor (3 December 1822 – 19 May 1904) was a Sorbian composer and conductor.

Kocor was born in Berge/Zahor near Großpostwitz/Budestecy.  He was the composer of the music of the Lusatian national anthem Rjana Łužica. He has been called the "founding father of secular Sorbian music."

References

1822 births
1904 deaths
People from Bautzen (district)
German composers
German conductors (music)
German male conductors (music)
Sorbian people
People from the Kingdom of Saxony
19th-century German musicians
19th-century German male musicians